Dacrycarpus is a genus of conifers belonging to the family Podocarpaceae.

Species
The species of Dacrycarpus range from New Zealand and Fiji, across New Caledonia, New Guinea, Indonesia, Malaysia and the Philippines to northern Myanmar and southern China. The greatest diversity (five species) exists in New Guinea.

References

External links
 Dacrycarpus At: Podocarpaceae At: The Gymnosperm Database

 
Podocarpaceae genera
Dioecious plants